Nightmare Classics (also known as Shelley Duvall's Nightmare Classics) is an American horror anthology television series created, produced and executive produced by Shelley Duvall featuring adaptations of well-known horror stories by authors including Henry James, Sheridan Le Fanu, Robert Louis Stevenson and Ambrose Bierce. Following the success of her two previous anthology series – Faerie Tale Theatre and Tall Tales & Legends – both of which were aimed at the elementary-school set, Duvall attempted to branch out to the teen and young adult audience with Nightmare Classics.

Broadcast
Nightmare Classics originally aired on Showtime from August 12 to November 26, 1989. Although planned as a six-episode series, only four were ultimately produced and it was the least successful series that Duvall produced for Showtime.

Episodes

Home video
Following their initial broadcast on Showtime, all four episodes of Nightmare Classics were each released as a stand-alone VHS in 1990 by Cannon Video.

See also
 Faerie Tale Theatre
 Tall Tales & Legends

References

External links 
 
 
 
 
 

1989 American television series debuts
1989 American television series endings
1980s American anthology television series
American horror fiction television series
English-language television shows
Showtime (TV network) original programming
Television shows based on short fiction
Films based on The Turn of the Screw
Films based on works by Sheridan Le Fanu
Films based on works by Robert Louis Stevenson